John M. Lonsdale (born 1937) is a British Africanist and historian. He is Emeritus Professor of Modern African History at the Centre of African Studies in the Faculty of History at the University of Cambridge. He is a Fellow of Trinity College there. As a schoolboy, he spent three summer holidays during 1953-1956 in Kenya where his father had just taken a job. He read history at Cambridge from 1958 through 1964. In 1956 he started his national service as a subaltern in the King's African Rifles. His first teaching job was in Dar es Salaam in 1964. 
Lonsdale studied the modern history of Kenya extensively and won the Outstanding African Studies Award of the African Studies Association of the United Kingdom in 2006.

Publications
Professor Lonsdale published many journal articles, books and book chapters including
 A political history of Nyanza, 1883-1945, PhD thesis University of Cambridge 1964
 Some Origins of Nationalism in East Africa, The Journal of African History 9 (1968), 119 - 146, Cambridge University Press
 Coping with the Contradictions: the Development of the Colonial State in Kenya, 1895-1914 by Bruce Berman and John Lonsdale, The Journal of African History 20 (1979), 487-505
 The growth and transformation of the colonial state in Kenya, 1929-52, University of Nairobi, Dept. of History, [1980], Series: Staff seminar paper (University of Nairobi. Department of History), 79/80, n. 17 
 Explanation of the Mau Mau revolt, Johannesburg : University of the Witwatersrand, 1983
 Kikuyu political thought and the ideologies of Mau Mau, Los Angeles (California), African Studies Association, 1986
 Mau Mau through the Looking Glass, Index on Censorship 15(1986), 19-22
 South Africa in question, John Lonsdale (Ed.), Cambridge: African Studies Centre, University of Cambridge ; London: Currey ; Portsmouth, N.H.: Heinemann, 1988
 Unhappy Valley : Conflict in Kenya and Africa. Book One: State and class. Book Two: Violence & Ethnicity by Bruce Berman and John Lonsdale, Eastern African Studies. Athens, Ohio: Ohio University Press. London: James Currey, Nairobi: Heinemann, 1992
 Politics in Kenya by John Lonsdale and Wanyiri Kihoro, Edinburgh University, Centre of African Studies, 1992
 'Listen while I read' : orality, literacy and Christianity in the young Kenyatta's making of the Kikuyu, Edinburgh, 1995
 Mau Mau and Nationhood : arms, authority & narration by E.S. Atieno Odhiambo and John Lonsdale, Oxford : Currey ; Nairobi : EAEP ; Athens : Ohio University Press, 2003
 Writing for Kenya. the life and works of Henry Muoria by Wangari Muoria-Sal, Bodil Folke Frederiksen, John Lonsdale, Derek Peterson (Eds.). Series: African Sources for African History, Volume: 10, Leiden & Boston: Brill, 2009
 Chapter 1. On Writing Kenya's History, in A Tapestry of African Histories: With Longer Times and Wider Geopolitics by Nicholas K. Githuku (Ed.), Lexington Books, 2021

References

External links
 . Frontline Club, uploaded 29 August 2012. 03/03/2009. Video of a panel discussion on Kenya with Michela Wrong, John Lonsdale, Joseph Warungu, Martin Kimani and Lindsey Hilsum. Duration 1:31:28.
 

Historians at the University of Cambridge
Alumni of Trinity College, Cambridge
British Africanists
British historians
Living people
1937 births
Presidents of the African Studies Association of the United Kingdom
Academic staff of the University of Dar es Salaam
Fellows of Trinity College, Cambridge
King's African Rifles officers